Raya Rasem Ghazi Hina (born 26 November 1995), known as Raya Hina, is a Jordanian footballer who plays as a forward for local Women's League club Shabab Al-Ordon and the Jordan women's national team.

International goals

References 

1995 births
Living people
Jordanian women's footballers
Jordan women's international footballers
Women's association football forwards
Sportspeople from Amman
Jordan Women's Football League players